Takeshi Mori may refer to:
Takeshi Mori (commander) (1894–1945), commander of the Japanese Empire's First Imperial Guards Division, at the end of World War II
Takeshi Mori (director) (born 1963), anime director, storyboard artist, and script writer
Takeshi Mori (announcer) (born 1959), announcer on Yomiuri TV in Japan
Takeshi Mori (voice actor), Japanese voice actor who has supplied voices for a number of video games including Fist of the North Star: Ken's Rage and Ace Combat Zero: The Belkan War